Dennis Shanahan is a political editor of The Australian, a newspaper in Australia.

Shanahan has been a journalist at major newspapers for "almost forty years".<ref name=AusBio>Dennis Shanahan at The Australian'''s website. (Retrieved 4 Dec 2012)</ref>
He covered NSW politics for the Sydney Morning Herald in the 1980s before joining The Australian''. He led the paper's Canberra Bureau for 10 years before becoming the paper's political editor, a position he has held for 11 years.

He is the father of Australian author and columnist Brendan Shanahan.

He is a right winged commentator who makes regular appearances on Sky News. In 2007, he was criticised by continuing to believe and tell readers that John Howard would win the election. Howard was beaten by a landslide and lost his own seat of Bennelong.

References

Living people
Australian editors
Year of birth missing (living people)
The Australian journalists
The Sydney Morning Herald people